Fernley may refer to:

People
 David Fernley (1934–2008), South African cricketer
 Fernley Marrison (1891–1967), English first-class cricketer and British Army officer

Places
 Fernley, Nevada, United States, a city
 Fernley Hills, a mountain range in Nevada